Phạm Văn Đồng (1 March 1906 – 29 April 2000) was a Vietnamese politician who served as Prime Minister of North Vietnam from 1955 to 1976. He later served as Prime Minister of Vietnam following reunification of North and South Vietnam from 1976 until he retired in 1987 under the rule of Lê Duẩn and Nguyễn Văn Linh. He was considered one of Hồ Chí Minh's closest lieutenants.

Early life 
According to an official report, Dong was born into a family of civil servants in Đức Tân village, Mộ Đức district, in Quảng Ngãi Province on the central coast on 1 March 1906.

In 1925 at the age of 18, he joined fellow students to stage a school sit-in to mourn the death of the famous patriotic scholar Phan Chu Trinh. About this time he developed an interest in the Communist party and in the unification of Vietnam. In 1926, he traveled to Guangzhou in southern China to attend a training course run by Nguyen Ai Quoc (later to be known as Ho Chi Minh), before being admitted as a member of the Vietnam Revolutionary Youth Association, the predecessor of the Communist Party of Vietnam (CPV).

In 1929, he worked for the revolutionary association in Saigon. In the same year, he was arrested, tried by the French colonial authorities and sentenced to ten years in prison. He served the term in Poulo Condor Island Prison until 1936 when he was released under the general amnesty granted by the government of the Popular Front in France after its recent electoral successes.

In 1936, he was released from prison, operating in Hanoi. In 1940, he secretly went to China with Võ Nguyên Giáp, joined the Indochinese Communist Party and was tasked by Ho Chi Minh to build a base at the Vietnam-China border.

In 1945, at the National People's Congress of Tân Trào, he was elected to the Standing Committee of 5 members of the National Committee for the Liberation, preparing for the August Revolution.

First Indochina War
Phạm Văn Đồng joined the Indochinese Communist Party in 1940 and then continued to take part in activities led by Ho Chi Minh. After Ho Chi Minh rose to power during the August Revolution in 1945, Phạm Văn Đồng was appointed minister of finance of the newly established government of the Democratic Republic of Vietnam (DRV), a position he occupied until 1946. Before he assumed the position of Minister of Finance, on May 31, 1946, he was the head of the delegation of the Democratic Republic of Vietnam at Fontainebleau (France) instead of Nguyễn Tường Tam who did not undertake the task, seeking an independent solution for Indochina. However, the conference failed because France did not give a definite answer to the deadline for the referendum in Cochinchina.

The first Indochina War erupted and Phạm Văn Đồng was appointed as the Special Envoy of the Central Committee of the Party and Government in South Central Vietnam. In 1947, he was elected as alternate member of the Central Committee of Indochinese Communist Party (official commissioner since 1949). From July 1949, he was appointed Deputy Prime Minister.

In 1954, Phạm Văn Đồng was appointed Head of the Government delegation to the Geneva Conference on Indochina. The contribution of the Vietnamese delegation led by him was extremely important, creating breakthroughs that brought the Conference to success. Throughout the 8 plenary sessions and 23 very tense and complex sessions, with the spirit of initiative and efforts of the Vietnamese delegation, on July 20, 1954, the agreement was suspended in Vietnam, Cambodia and Laos have been recognized for respecting the independence and sovereignty of Vietnam, Laos and Cambodia.

In September 1954, Phạm Văn Đồng served as Minister of Foreign Affairs of the Democratic Republic of Vietnam, Head of Foreign Affairs of the Central Party. From September 1955 he was the Prime Minister of the Democratic Republic of Vietnam and since 1976 has been the Prime Minister of Vietnam, the Vice President of the National Defense Council until his retirement in 1987. He was a member of the National Assembly from 1946 to 1987.

Following the defeat of Japan, nationalist forces fought French colonial forces in the First Indochina War that lasted from 1945 to 1954. The French suffered a major defeat at the Battle of Dien Bien Phu in 1954 and peace was sought. In May 1954, he led the delegation of the Ho Chi Minh government to the Geneva Conference. After intense negotiations a peace treaty was signed and the French forces withdrew from direct conflict with the newly independent North Vietnam. He signed the peace accords with French Premier Pierre Mendès France.

Second Indochinese War 
During 1954 he served as Vice-Premier and Minister of Foreign Affairs. At the 5th session of the DRV First National Assembly convocation (1955), Dong was appointed as Prime Minister. Ho Chi Minh had suffered several stokes in the early 1960s, causing him to largely retire from the day-to-day management of North Vietnam. Owing to Ho's absence, Đồng became the face of North Vietnam during the war with the United States, as he was the one who usually spoke to foreign diplomats and journalists. He was known to have close links with the Chinese government, which helped fund the conflict with South Vietnam. He was also one of the figures involved in peace talks to end the conflict under the administrations of Lyndon B. Johnson and Richard Nixon.

In 1963, Đồng was involved in the "Maneli affair", named after Mieczysław Maneli, the Polish commissioner to the International Control Commission. In May 1963 Đồng told Maneli he was interested in his peace plan calling for a federation of the two Vietnams, saying that just as long as the American advisers left South Vietnam "we can come to an agreement with any Vietnamese". Reflecting the problems imposed by the drought in North Vietnam, Đồng told Maneli that he was willing to accept a ceasefire which would be followed up by a barter trade with coal from North Vietnam being exchanged for rice from South Vietnam.

In 1964–65, Đồng was involved in the so-called "Seaborn Mission", meeting with the diplomat J. Blair Seaborn, who served as the Canadian Commissioner to the International Control Commission. On 8 June 1964, Đồng met Seaborn in Hanoi. Seaborn had an offer from President Johnson promising billions of American economic aid and diplomatic recognition of North Vietnam in exchange for North Vietnam ending its attempts to overthrow the government of South Vietnam. Seaborn also warned that Johnson had told him that he was considering a strategic bombing campaign against North Vietnam if his offer was rejected. Đồng told Seaborn that the American terms were unacceptable as he demanded the end of American assistance to South Vietnam; South Vietnam to become neutral in the Cold War; and for the National Liberation Front, better known as the Viet Cong, to take part in a coalition government in Saigon.

Later life
In general, Phạm Văn Đồng was considered a staunch communist and a great nationalist leader, one of the most faithful disciples of Ho Chi Minh and a major figure in Vietnam's fight for independence and unity. He was known as a politician who tried to maintain a neutral position in the various conflicts within the party, particularly after the establishment of the Vietnamese Socialist Republic in 1976.

Although retired from public office, he served as a Counsellor to the Party Central Committee from December 1986 to 1997. He often urged the party to make greater efforts to stop corruption, which is still a widespread problem in Vietnam today. He gave advice on similar issues, even after his term as an adviser to the Central Committee had ended.

As he became older, his vision deteriorated, and he was blind for the last 10 years of his life. After several months of illness, he died in Hanoi on 29 April 2000, at the age of 94. His death was announced by the Vietnamese Communist Party and the Vietnamese government a week later on 2 May. Commemoration and funeral services were held on 6 May 2000, in Hanoi.

Books and articles
Karnow, Stanley Vietnam: A History, New York: Viking, 1983, .
Miller, Edward Misalliance: Ngo Dinh Diem, the United States, and the Fate of South Vietnam, Cambridge: Harvard University Press, 2013,

References

Prime Ministers of Vietnam
1906 births
2000 deaths
Viet Minh members
Members of the 2nd Politburo of the Workers' Party of Vietnam
Members of the 3rd Politburo of the Workers' Party of Vietnam
Members of the 4th Politburo of the Communist Party of Vietnam
Members of the 5th Politburo of the Communist Party of Vietnam
Members of the 2nd Secretariat of the Workers' Party of Vietnam
Alternates of the 1st Central Committee of the Indochinese Communist Party
Members of the 2nd Central Committee of the Workers' Party of Vietnam
Members of the 3rd Central Committee of the Workers' Party of Vietnam
Members of the 4th Central Committee of the Communist Party of Vietnam
Members of the 5th Central Committee of the Communist Party of Vietnam
Deputy Prime Ministers of Vietnam
Foreign ministers of Vietnam
Finance ministers of Vietnam
Vietnamese people of the Vietnam War
People from Quảng Ngãi province
Vietnamese nationalists